The 1998–99 Slovenian Football Cup was the eighth season of the Slovenian Football Cup, Slovenia's football knockout competition.

Qualified clubs

1997–98 Slovenian PrvaLiga members
Beltinci
Celje
Gorica
Korotan Prevalje
Maribor
Mura
Olimpija
Primorje
Rudar Velenje
Vevče

Qualified through MNZ Regional Cups
MNZ Ljubljana: Ivančna Gorica, Kolpa, Domžale
MNZ Maribor: Pobrežje, Paloma, Rogoza
MNZ Celje: Šoštanj, Šmartno
MNZ Koper: Tabor Sežana, Jadran
MNZ Nova Gorica: Renče, Brda
MNZ Murska Sobota: Beltinci, Goričanka, Ižakovci
MNZ Lendava: Nafta Lendava, Turnišče
MNZG-Kranj: Triglav Kranj, Zarica
MNZ Ptuj: Drava Ptuj, Aluminij, Dornava

First round

|}

Round of 16

|}

Quarter-finals

|}

Semi-finals

|}

Final

First leg

Second leg

References

Slovenian Football Cup seasons
Cup
Slovenian Cup